St. Regis Falls is a census-designated place (CDP) in Waverly, Franklin County, New York, United States. The population of the CDP was 464 at the 2010 census.

Geography

St. Regis Falls is located at the northern end of the town of Waverly, along the north side of the St. Regis River, a tributary of the St. Lawrence River. The falls for which the community is named are on the river at the western end of town.

New York State Route 458 passes through the community, leading west  to Nicholville and southeast  to Santa Clara.

The northern border of the CDP follows the Waverly/Dickinson town line.

Saint Regis Falls Central School is located in the northern part of the CDP, serving the town of Waverly and surrounding towns.

The marshy area east of the village where the water meets Duane Street (Red Tavern Road) on both sides just before Trim Hill is often referred to as Alligator Alley.

Demographics

References

Census-designated places in New York (state)
Census-designated places in Franklin County, New York